Stypopodium is a genus of thalloid brown alga in the family Dictyotaceae. Members of the genus are found in shallow tropical and subtropical seas around Africa, Pakistan, India, Japan, Indonesia, Australia, Micronesia, the Caribbean, Venezuela, and Brazil.

Characteristics
They are attached to the substrate by a rhizoidal holdfast and often form bushy clumps. The blades are membranous and either wedge shaped or divided into linear segments. The sporangia are densely scattered over the surface of the blade or occur in irregularly-shaped sori, forming four spores.

Species
The World Register of Marine Species includes the following species in the genus:
Stypopodium atomarium (Woodward) Kützing
Stypopodium australasicum (Zanardini) Allender & Kraft, 1983
Stypopodium flabelliforme Weber-van Bosse, 1913
Stypopodium multipartitum (Suhr) P.C.Silva, 1996
Stypopodium rabdoides (Allender & Kraft) Kraft, 2009
Stypopodium schimperi (Buchinger ex Kützing) Verlaque & Boudouresque, 1991
Stypopodium shameelii M.Nizamuddin & K.Aisha
Stypopodium tubruqense M.Nizamuddin & M.Godeh
Stypopodium zonale (J.V.Lamouroux) Papenfuss, 1940

References

Dictyotaceae
Brown algae genera